The 1947 Chicago Cardinals season was the franchise's 28th season in the National Football League. The Cardinals won the second NFL championship in team history against the Philadelphia Eagles. The team was led by its "Million Dollar Backfield" of Elmer Angsman, Charley Trippi, Paul Christman, and Pat Harder. The Cardinals, however, wouldn't win another playoff game for an NFL record 51 years. As of the end of 2022, this is the team's last league championship. This championship drought is currently the longest active one in American professional sports. Until the 2018 season 71 years later, this and 1949 also marked the last time the Cardinals beat the Green Bay Packers on the road.

The last remaining active member of the 1947 Chicago Cardinals was Charley Trippi, who retired after the 1955 season.

Before the season

Draft

Regular season

Schedule

Playoffs

Standings

Final roster

Postseason

NFL Championship Game
The 1947 NFL Championship Game was the 15th annual championship game and was held December 28, 1947, at Comiskey Park in Chicago. The game featured the Western Division champion Chicago Cardinals (9–3) and the Eastern Division champion Philadelphia Eagles (8–4). The Cardinals won the game by a score of 28–21.

Awards and records
 Pat Harder, NFL scoring leader: 102 points 
 Pat Harder, NFL record, most field goals in one game: 7

References

External links
 Cardinals on Pro Football Reference

Chicago Cardinals
1947
National Football League championship seasons
Chicago Card